Miss Grand Colombia is an annual female beauty pageant in Colombia, founded in 2018 by Top 3 Latam chaired by Neyder Duarte. Previously, the country representatives were selected by the International Portfolio Agency headed by Elías Tobón and Mara Borrego, either by handpicking or through their national pageant, Miss Earth Colombia. Currently, the franchise belongs to the Bogota-based modeling agency, Casa De Reinas SAS which owns and runs the Miss Grand Colombia beauty contest since 2022.

Colombia holds a record of 5 placements at Miss Grand International, the highest position was the fourth runner-up obtained by Mónica Castaño in 2014. The reigning Miss Grand Colombia is Priscilla Londoño who was crowned on 15 June 2022 at the Hotel Grand Park in Bogotá, she placed as Top 10 finalist (5th Runner up) in Miss Grand International 2022.

History
Colombia has been taking part in the Miss Grand International since 2013. However, most of its representatives were assigned to participate without organizing the national preliminary contest specifically. In 2018, the first edition of Miss Grand Colombia was conducted in Villeta of Cundinamarca Department at the BH Tempo Hotel on 11 February after Miss Earth Colombia, who served as the national licensee during 2013 – 2017, had lost the franchise to Top 3 Latam – the Cundinamarca-based pageant organizer, headed by Neyder Duarte. The contest featured 5 national finalists representing 5 national regions, including Altiplano, Andean, Llanos, Orinoquía, and Sinú, of which Génesis Andrea Quintero Pérez from Orinoquía was announced the winner and expected to compete in Myanmar for the international title, but unfortunately forced to resign by the organizer due to health problems after having breast augmentation as well as the financial conflict between them. The organizer then relinquished the franchise to the Concurso Nacional de Belleza de Colombia (CNB Colombia; Miss Colombia), who appointed Sheyla Quizena Nieto to compete at the said platform instead. Nevertheless, Quintero was later assigned to participate in the following international edition in Venezuela by the 2019 national licensee – Luis Humberto Garcés, as the replacement of the former representative, Sthefany Rodríguez, the Colombian-Venezuelan model who resigned the title two months after the appointment; and was placed among the top 20 finalists. Since then, the license had been being transferred to the different organizers every year, including Juan José Mendoza in 2020, back to Miss Colombia in 2021, and under the control of César Prado in 2022.

The representatives of Colombia got placements at Miss Grand International four times in 2013, 2014, 2019, and 2021. The highest one was the fourth runner-up, won by Mónica Castaño in 2014.

Editions
The following list is the edition detail of the Miss Grand Colombia contest, since its inception in 2018.

National finalists
The following list is the national finalists of the Miss Grand Colombia pageant, as well as the competition results.

Color keys
 Declared as the winner
 Ended as a runner-up
 Ended as a semifinalist
 Ended as a quaterfinalist
 Did not participate
 Withdraw during the competition

2023–present : Department Representatives

2022 : National Finalists

2018 : Region Representatives

Representatives at Miss Grand International
Color keys

Winner gallery

See also

 Miss Grand International
 Miss Colombia
 Miss Universe Colombia
 Miss Mundo Colombia
 Miss Earth Colombia

References

External links

 

Beauty pageants in Colombia
Recurring events established in 2018
2018 establishments in Colombia
Colombian awards